Humid oxidation with peroxide (OHP) is a technology for wastewater treatment which uses hydrogen peroxide to generate highly oxidative hydroxyl radicals. OHP can be used to treat all types of organic wastewaters to achieve chemical oxygen demand (COD) and total organic carbon (TOC) reduction, or increase biodegradability. It can be applied as the standalone treatment or combined with a more economical biological treatment, depending on the oxidant's dose. 
 
This technology is based on Fenton's reaction (Fenton's reagent). It consists in the oxidation of organic matter using hydroxyl radicals generated from hydrogen peroxide by ferrous ions. The OHP reaction is carried out in the acidic medium and mild condition of temperature (100-150 degrees Celsius) and pressure (2-4 bar) in a safe and efficient way, using optimized catalyst and hydrogen peroxide formulations. 
 
Combination of mild temperatures (higher than conventional Fenton's reaction but still lower than other oxidative techniques) together permits to cover the gap between wastewater technologies to treat the effluents with moderate to high refractory organic matter content and low biodegradability. There are some types of wastewater where conventional treatment methods (biological, physical-chemical) are not efficient enough and on the other hand severe conditions oxidative methods (incineration, high pressure/temperature oxidation systems) are not economically attractive.  

The use of a strong oxidant and higher temperatures and pressures as in OHP significantly improves the grade of mineralisation of most organic compounds with small residence times and more efficient usage of hydrogen peroxide. For these effluents OHP process can be an alternative or a complementary treatment. However, complete mineralisation may not be necessary to increase biodegradability to acceptable levels. The future of Advanced Oxidation Process (AOP) techniques lies in its use as pre-treatment followed by biological treatment
Sewerage